Zurab Kipshidze (10 Aug 1953) is a Georgian film and theatre actor. He appeared in 58 films between 1966 and 2009. In 2013 he was a member of the jury at the 35th Moscow International Film Festival.

Filmography
 As actor
 Rac Am Kvekhnad Siyvaruli Mephobs (TV Movie) (2013) 
 Midioda matarebeli (2005)
 Kidev erti qartuli istoria (2003)
 Antimoz iverieli (2001)
 Misterii (2000)
 Samotkhe chveni qalaqis quchebshi (TV Movie) (2000)
 Dzvirpaso M (TV Movie)  (1999)
 Martoobis ordenis kavaleri (1999)
 Time of a Dancer (1998)
 Qaragma (TV Movie)  (1997)
 Orpeosis sikvdili (1996)
 Tsarsulis achrdilebi (1995)
 Chakluli suli (1994)
 Expres-Inpormatsia (1994)
 Anas dabadebis dge (TV Movie) (1992)
 Bediani (TV Movie) (1992)
 Oqros oboba (TV Series) (1992)
 Amkhanag Stalinis mogzauroba aprikashi (1991)
 Alka (1990)
 Kedeli (1990)
 Giga, Angel, Snezhok i drugie (1989)
 Martokhela monadire (1989)
 Tsodvis shvilebi (TV Movie) (1989)
 Bravo, Alber Lolish (1987)
 Elisa da Rarus tavgadasavali (1987)
 Argonavtebi (TV Movie)  (1986)
 Bagrationi (1985)
 The Legend of Suram Fortress (1985)
 Arsenas Leksi (TV Movie) (1985)
 Neilonis nadzvis khe (1985)
 Voyage of the Young Composer (1985)
 Krosvordis amokhsnis mokvarultatvsis (1981)
 Gza shinisaken (1981)
 Tsinaparta mitsa (1981)
 Matsi Khvitia (1966)
 Tsutisopeli (1971)

References

External links
 
 Zurab Kipshidze 

1953 births
Actors from Tbilisi
Soviet male film actors
Living people